This is a list of flags of states, territories, former, and other geographic entities (plus a few non-geographic flags) sorted by their combinations of dominant colors. Flags emblazoned with seals, coats of arms, and other multicolored emblems are sorted only by their color fields. The color of text is almost entirely ignored.

Colors related to the two metals of European heraldry (gold and white) are sorted first. The five major colors of European heraldry (black, red, blue, green, and purple) are sorted next. Miscellaneous colors (murrey, tan, grey, and pink) are sorted last.

Similar colors are grouped together to make navigation of this list practical. As such, the dark greens prevalent in the Middle East are sorted together with the brighter greens prevalent in Western Europe. Significantly, yellows, golds, and oranges are grouped together as "gold" due to the lack of discrete divisions within this spectrum and the differing standards of interpretation of "gold", which appears in the legally codified specifications of many flags. Some flags, including a number from South Asia, include both a distinct yellow and a distinct orange; these have been noted accordingly. Magenta is included with red.

Gold

, United States (with multicolored seal)
 (1632–1946)
, Poland (with multicolored coat of arms)

Gold, white

 (1527–1813)
 (with distinct yellow and orange)
 (1837–1866)
 (with distinct orange)
, United States (with a distinct gold and orange and a brown emblem)
 – flag used by several Crusader states
, Poland (with multicolored coat of arms)
 (1250–1517)
, Japan
, Guatemala
, California, United States (with multicolored emblem)

, Indonesia
 (with multicolored emblem)

Gold, white, black

, Maryland, United States
 (1906–1959)
, Poland
, England, United Kingdom
, Malaysia
 (1858–1883), House of Romanov
, Scotland, United Kingdom
, Poland

Gold, white, black, red

, England, United Kingdom

, Belgium
, Switzerland
, United States
, Venezuela (with multicolored emblem)

 (with distinct gold and red)
, Netherlands
, Poland
, Finland

 (with multicolored emblem)

Gold, white, black, red, blue 

, France

, England, United Kingdom
, Caribbean Netherlands
, France

 (1938–1940)
 (1940–1943)
, England, United Kingdom

, Switzerland
, one of the British Channel Islands
, France
 (1932–1945)
, France
, Canada
, Poland
, France
, Brazil
, Australia

Gold, white, black, red, blue, green 

, Poland
, Poland
, French overseas collectivity, unofficial

Gold, white, black, red, blue, green, purple, brown, pink, orange 

 – with distinct yellow and orange, and two shades of blue

Gold, white, black, red, green 

 (with multicolored emblem)

 (with distinct yellow and orange)

, Colombia
, Venezuela

 (1979)

Gold, white, black, blue

, France
, Poland
, United States

, Venezuela

Gold, white, black, blue, green

, Venezuela
, Philippines

Gold, white, black, blue, green, brown

, Venezuela

Gold, white, black, green

, Colombia
, Poland
, Ecuador
, Netherlands

Gold, white, black, green, murrey

 – with other color symbol

Gold, white, black, purple

Gold, white, red

, Netherlands
, France
, Spain
, Poland (with multicolored coat of arms)
, Poland (with multicolored coat of arms)
, Austria
, United States (with multicolored seal)
 (1920–1939)
, England, United Kingdom
, 1814–1815, used during Napoleon Bonaparte's imprisonment
, England, United Kingdom
, France
, Poland
, Poland
, Poland
 (British crown dependency)
, Netherlands
, France
, France
, Poland
 (British crown dependency)
, Poland (with multicolored coat of arms)
  (British crown dependency)
, Poland
, Belgium
, England, United Kingdom
, former administrative region of France
, France
, Poland
, Poland
, England, United Kingdom
, Russia
, Ukraine
, Poland
, a French region
, Russia
, United States (with multicolored seal)
, United States
, one of the British Channel Islands
, France (with other color symbol)
, Malaysia
 (de facto state, limited recognition)
, Poland
, Poland (with multicolored coat of arms)
, Poland
, England, United Kingdom
, Poland
, England, United Kingdom

Gold, white, red, blue

, Canada
, Louisiana, United States
, French Mandate for Syria and Lebanon (1920–1936)
, Netherlands (with other color symbol)
, France

, Belgium
, France
, France
 (de facto separatist state, not recognized by UN)
, Kingdom of the Netherlands
, Macedonia
, Canada
, Belgium
 (with distinct yellow and orange)

, Spain
, Argentina (with multicolored emblem)
, France
, France
, Argentina
, United States (1911–1964)
, United States
, France
, France
  (unrecognised, 1991–1996)
, Colorado, United States
, Michigan, United States
, France
, Paraguay – with other color symbol
, flag of the Catalan independence movement
, Soviet Union (1953–1990)
, France
, France
, Venezuela
, Moldova
, United States
, France
, France
, England, United Kingdom (a brownish red)
, France
, France
, France
, Soviet Union (1952–1992)

, Poland
, United States
, Soviet Union (1953–1990)
, Netherlands
, Ecuador
, France
 (Portuguese autonomous region)
 (1948–1963)

, French overseas department, unofficial
, Germany
, Malaysia
 (1939–1945)
, United States
, Ecuador
, Canada
, Australia

, United States
, Finland
, Canada
 (1857-1902)
, France (with black outlines)
, England, United Kingdom

, Poland
, Poland
, Caribbean Netherlands
, Missouri, United States
, France
, France
, France
, Poland
, United States
, used by Swedish and Norwegian warships, 1844–1905
, Poland
, New South Wales, Australia
, France (with other color symbol)
, China – with other color symbol
 – two different shades of blue

, Soviet Union (1953–1991)
, Russia (1997–2007)
, Venezuela
 (with multicolored seal)
, Serbia
, Venezuela (with multicolored emblem)
, France
, Netherlands (with multicolored seal)
, Poland

Gold, white, red, blue, green

 (1821–1889), House of Braganza
, France

, French Mandate for Syria and Lebanon (1921–1936)
, Russia
, Uzbekistan
, Russia
, Paraguay – with other color symbol

, Canada
, Wales, United Kingdom
, Brazil

, Brazil
, Brazil

, Caribbean Netherlands
, Ethiopia
, United States
, France
 (US insular area)

Gold, white, red, blue, green, brown 

  (1841–1997)

Gold, white, red, blue, purple

 Polyamory pride flag (version created in 2022 by Red Howell)

Gold, white, red, blue, green, purple

, Russian Far East, Russia (with distinct yellow and orange)
 (with distinct yellow and orange)

Gold, white, red, green 

, one of the British Channel Islands
, São Paulo, Brazil
, Soviet Union (1951–1991)
, Russia
 (1946–1950)
, Iraq
, Venezuela
, Belgium
, Soviet Union (1953–1988)
, Poland

 (1811–1814)
, Canada
, Spain (with multicolored coat of arms)
, Myanmar

, Soviet Union (1953–1992)

, Switzerland

, France

Gold, white, red, purple

, Spain
, Spain

Gold, white, blue 

, France
, United States (with multicolored seal)
, used by the unrecognized Republic of Anguilla (1967–1969)
, France
, Australia
 (Portuguese autonomous region) (with multicolored coat of arms)
, Poland

, Queensland, Australia
, Russia
, Spain
, Argentina
, Panama (with multicolored coat of arms)
, Kingdom of the Netherlands
, Poland
, United States – with other color symbol
, France
, France
, Israel
, Russia

, Netherlands
, France
, France
, United States (with multicolored seal)
, New South Wales, Australia, unofficial
, Chile
, France

, Wales, United Kingdom

, United States

, United States
, Poland (with multicolored coat of arms)
, Ceará, Brazil
, Malaysia (with multicolored emblem)
 (historical flag of the Netherlands)
, Poland
, United States
, United Kingdom
, France
, Japan
 (with multicolored emblem), 1928–1994
, Central Macedonia, Greece
, Argentina
, Brazil
 (New Zealand territory)
, Russia

, Finland
, France
 (1958–1962)
, France

Gold, white, blue, green

, Brazil
, Andorra
, Venezuela (with multicolored emblem)
, Russia
, Venezuela (with multicolored emblem)

, Brazil
, Argentina (with multicolored emblems)
 (Australian external territory)
, United States – with other color symbol
, England, United Kingdom
, England, United Kingdom
, Netherlands
, Argentina
, Ceará, Brazil
, Brazil
, Venezuela (with two multicolored emblems)
, Brazil
, Brazil
 (1964–1985), extinct political party of Brazil
, Venezuela
, Brazil
, United States
, Venezuela
, Brazil
, Brazil
, Brazil

, England, United Kingdom

Gold, white, blue, tan

, Poland

Gold, white, blue, grey

, Belgium

Gold, white, green

, Pakistan
, Panama (with black and white text)
, Colombia

, Brazil
 (1947–1950)
, Japan
, Colombia
 (with blue emblem)

 (Chinese special administrative region)
, Florida, United States

, Panama

, Ecuador
, Switzerland
, England, United Kingdom
, Ecuador
, Poland

Gold, white, green, murrey

Gold, white, green, tan

Gold, white, purple

, Japan
, Japan

Gold, white, murrey

, Paraguay (with multicolored coat of arms)

Gold, white, murrey, tan

Gold, white, pink

 (five stripes variant; with distinct light and dark orange, and distinct light and dark pink)

Gold, black

, Germany
, Maryland, United States (with other color emblem)
 (1526–1860)
, Belgium (with multicolored emblem)
 (1300s–1945)
 (1777–1884)
 (with multicolored coat of arms)

, Belgium
, France (with multicolored emblem)
, Pennsylvania, United States (with multicolored emblem)
, Poland
, historical flag of Wales, United Kingdom
 (to 1826)
, Germany (to 1876)
, Germany
, the Netherlands
 (with yellow text and seal)

, the Netherlands

Gold, black, red

, Switzerland
, Switzerland

, Puerto Rico
, Belgium (with other color symbol)
, Germany (with white in coat of arms)
, Malaysia
, Colombia
 (1347–1833)
, North Holland, The Netherlands
, Germany (1919–1920)
, Germany (to 1919)
, Germany (to 1919)
 (to 1820)
, Germany (with white in coat of arms)
, Germany (with multicolored coat of arms)
, Malaysia

, Switzerland
, Switzerland
, Germany (1921–1929)
, Germany (to 1921)
, Belgium
, West Germany (1945–1952)

Gold, black, red, blue

, New Zealand
, United States (with multicolored emblem)
, Poland (with multicolored coat of arms)
 Polyamory pride flag (version created in 1995 by Jim Evans)

Gold, black, red, blue, green

, used in New Caledonia alongside the French flag

Gold, black, red, green

, breakaway region from Mali
, Ethiopia
 (1967–1970, de facto state, limited recognition)
 (1975–1992)

 (1961–2001)

Gold, black, blue

, France
 (1731–1964)
, Scotland, United Kingdom (with multicolored emblem)
, Venezuela
, Ukraine
, Ukraine
 (1948–1960)
, Netherlands
, Wales, United Kingdom
, Rondônia, Brazil
, Paraguay – with other color symbol
, England, United Kingdom
, New Zealand (with multicolored emblem)
 (January 1964)

Gold, black, blue, green

, French overseas department, unofficial
, British colony, 1882–1983, adopted in 1967

Gold, black, green

 (1967, unrecognised, not to be confused with current Benin)
, United States (with distinct yellow and orange)

, Germany (1813–1897)
, Germany (1897–1920)
 (1723–1949)

Gold, black, murrey

, England, United Kingdom
, Sri Lanka

Gold, red

, Ethiopia
, Poland (with multicolored coat of arms)
, Wales, United Kingdom
, Spain (with multicolored coat of arms)
, Venezuela (with multicolored coat of arms)

, France
, Ecuador
, Germany (to 1891)
, Germany (1891–1945)
, West Germany (1945–1952)
, Colombia (with multicolored coat of arms)
, Austria
, flag of Catalonia (Spain), Northern Catalonia (France) and Alghero (Italy)

, Russia
, Poland
, France
, Poland (with multicolored coat of arms)
, Poland (with multicolored coat of arms)
, France (with other color symbol)
, France

 (1976–1979)
 (1979–1989)

 (1719–1852)
, Belgium
, Germany (1815–1880)
, Germany (1880–1947)
, Poland
, Poland
, France
, Poland
, Netherlands
, Comoros autonomous island
, Myanmar
 (with multicolor coat of arms)
, Italy
, United States
, Japan
 (1992–1995)

, France, Jersey, Guernsey
, England, United Kingdom
, Poland
, historical region in southern Europe
, Ecuador
, Poland (with multicolored coat of arms)
, Czech Republic
, South Africa
, a historical French province
, Poland
, France
, Poland
, Scotland, United Kingdom
, Sweden
, Japan
, Italy (with other color symbol)
, Poland (with multicolored coat of arms)
, England, United Kingdom
, Netherlands (with black outline)
 – with other color symbol
, England, United Kingdom
, Taiwan
, France
, Ethiopia
 (1923–1991)
, Sri Lanka
, administrative entity in Catalonia
, Spain

, 1955–1975
, Belgium
, Poland
, England, United Kingdom
, Poland (with multicolored coat of arms)
, Poland

Gold, red, blue

, South Australia, Australia (with multicolored emblems)
 (Finnish autonomous territory)
, France
 – with other color symbol
 (1803–1810)

, Soviet Union (1952–1990)
, United States – blue, red, gold and copper
, Soviet Union (1952–1991)
, France
, France
, Ecuador

, Poland

 (1963–1966)
 (1966–1971)

, France
, Colombia (with multicolored coat of arms)
 (with multicolored coat of arms)
 (1920–1924)
 (1821–1831)
 (1946–1950)
, France

, Soviet Union (1953–1992)
, France
, Poland
, France
, France
, France
, Germany (to 1933)
, Germany (to 1933)
 (1859–1862)
 (1862–1866)
 – with other color symbol

, United States
, Canada – with other color symbol
, Netherlands
, Scotland, United Kingdom
, Netherlands
, France
, Poland
, French overseas department, unofficial

, Soviet Union (1954–1991)
, Sweden
, Poland (with multicolored coat of arms)
, Soviet Union (1952–1992)
, Soviet Union (1950–1991)
, Spain – with other color symbol
, France
, 1975–1976
, Netherlands
, Belgium
 (1805–1814)
, Poland

Gold, red, blue, green

, Argentina
, Venezuela (with black silhouette)

, Netherlands
, Soviet Union (1953–1956)
, England, United Kingdom

, France (with black outlines)

Gold, red, blue, green, purple

, Peru (with distinct yellow and orange)
 (six-color version popular since 1979, with royal blue replacing both turquoise and indigo) – with distinct yellow and orange

Gold, red, blue, tan

, Oklahoma, United States

Gold, red, green

, Brazil
, flag used during the 1971-1972 Bangladesh Liberation War

, England, United Kingdom (a brownish red)
, Colombia

, Ecuador
, Colombia

 (1914–1996)
, French overseas department, unofficial

, Hungary
, England, United Kingdom
 (1568–1946)

, California, United States (with multicolored seal)

, Soviet Union (1952–1990)
, Spain
, France
 (Syrian Civil War territory)
 (1959–1961)
, Canada

 (de facto state, limited recognition)
 (December 1963 – January 1964)

Gold, red, green, tan

 (1971–1997)

Gold, red, purple

, Venezuela (with multicolored emblem)

Gold, blue

, United States
, France
, Spain
, nominally independent homeland (Bantustan), 1977–1994 (with white-and-black emblem)
, Germany (to 1946)
, Poland (with multicolored coat of arms)
, England, United Kingdom (two shades of blue)
, Greece
, England, United Kingdom
 (1877–1908)
 (1908–1960)
 (1960–1963)
 (1997–2003)
 (2003–2006)
, England, United Kingdom
, France
 (Haddingtonshire), Scotland, United Kingdom

, Italy
, Poland
, Canada
, Netherlands
, Panama
, United States
, France
, Mexico (with multicolored coat of arms)
, United States – with other color symbol
, Poland (with multicolored coat of arms)

, Poland (with multicolored coat of arms)
, Poland (with multicolored coat of arms)
, Netherlands
, Austria
, Poland (with multicolored coat of arms)
, Paraguay
 (1806–1866)
, United States
, Poland
, Poland
, United States – reverse has same colors
, New Zealand
, Poland (with multicolored coat of arms)

, Malaysia
, Pennsylvania, United States (with multicolored emblem)
, Poland
, Poland (with multicolored coat of arms)
, Poland (with multicolored coat of arms)
, Canada
, Poland
, flag of the Kingdom of Mercia
, Poland
, Poland (with multicolored coat of arms)
, Poland (with multicolored coat of arms)
, Tunisia
, United States
, United States (with multicolored emblem)
, England, United Kingdom
, England, United Kingdom
, England, United Kingdom

, Netherlands
, Japan

Gold, blue, green

, Venezuela (with black outline of the state)
, Indonesia
, Poland
, Colombia

, Colombia
, Poland
 (with distinct yellow and gold)

, Poland
 (1956–1970)
, Berber people
, Poland (with sun with a black outline from the coat of arms)

Gold, blue, green, tan

, United States cultural region, unofficial
, nominally independent homeland (Bantustan) (1979–1994)

Gold, blue, green, grey

, Colombia

Gold, blue, pink

Gold, green

, Netherlands
, Russia
, Thailand (with multicolored seal and distinct yellow)
, Paraguay – with other color symbol
, Wales, United Kingdom
, Colombia
, Colombia
, Ecuador
, Spain
, Netherlands
, England, United Kingdom
 (1757–1946)
 (1959–2017)
, Japan
, Ecuador
, Colombia

, Ecuador
 (1771–1950)
, Israel
, England, United Kingdom
, Spain
, Colombia

Gold, green, purple

, Colombia

Gold, green, murrey

 (with distinct yellow and orange)

Gold, green, tan

 (Australian external territory)
 (1914–1930)

Gold, purple

, Thailand (with multicolored seal)
, Thailand (with multicolored seal and distinct orange)
, Italy (with multicolored coat of arms)

, Japan

Gold, murrey

 (1948–1951)
, Thailand (with multicolored seal)
, Spain
, Colombia

Gold, pink

, used in Cantabria, Spain

White

, internationally recognised as a sign of truce, ceasefire, and surrender. The flag of the Kingdom of France in 1814–1830, during the Bourbon Restoration.
 (with black text)
, flag used since early 2016 (with green and black text)
, Argentina (with multicolored coat of arms)
, Paraguay (with multicolored coat of arms)
, Poland (with multicolored coat of arms), as well as its gmina
 (with black text)

, Argentina (with multicolored coat of arms)

, Paraguay (with multicolored coat of arms)
, Paraguay (with multicolored coat of arms)
, United States (with multicolored coat of arms)
, Poland (with multicolored coat of arms)
, Germany (1803–1892) – with multicolored coat of arms
, Mexico (with multicolored coat of arms)
, Mexico (with multicolored coat of arms)
, French overseas collectivity, unofficial (with multicolored coat of arms)
, Argentina (with multicolored coat of arms)
, Oklahoma, United States (with multicolored emblems), flag used from 1973 to 2018

White, black

, Switzerland
, France

, Spain (with multicolored coat of arms)
, from the Battle of Gonzales during the Texas Revolution
, England, United Kingdom
, France
, Netherlands
, Switzerland
, Belgium (with multicolored emblem)
 (to 1850) – with multicolored coat of arms
 (to 1850) – with multicolored coat of arms
, Terrorist organisation
 (1528–1855)
, France
, Malaysia
, Germany (1892–1918) – with multicolored coat of arms
, Germany (1918–1947) – with multicolored coat of arms
, Germany (civil flag, 1701–1947)
 
, unofficial flag of New Zealand

, Malaysia
, former crusader state

White, black, red

 (1929)
, Netherlands
, Switzerland
, Switzerland
 (in exile, 1919–1925)
, Germany
, Belgium (with gold on coat of arms)

, Netherlands
, England, United Kingdom
, Wales, United Kingdom
 (1867–1918)
 (1935–1945)
, Japan
, Poland
, Spain
, France

, Brazil
, Australia (with ochre-red)
, Ethiopia (with multicolored emblem)
, Brazil
, Netherlands
, Spain
, now used by the city of Laredo, Texas, United States
 (1798–1799)
 (1802–1811)

, Italy
 (micronation)

, Russia
 (1959–1984)

White, black, red, blue

, France
, United States (with multicolored symbol)

, proposed alternative flag of New Zealand
, Brazil

, proposed alternative flag of New Zealand
, Texas, United States
, New Zealand
 (1967–1990)

White, black, red, green

, 1916–1918 revolt against the Ottoman Empire
 (with combined national flag and white background)
, Poland
, Ethiopia
 (1964–1966)
 (1883–1885, unrecognized)

 (1924–1959)

 (2010–2012)
, Panama
, Poland

, Ecuador – with other color symbol

 (Syria, 1930–1958, 1961–1963)

White, black, red, grey

, Latvia

White, black, blue

, Switzerland

, France

, France
, France
, France

 (1920–1935)
, Finland

White, black, blue, green

, England, United Kingdom

White, black, green

, England, United Kingdom
, Belgium (with other color symbol)
, Spain – with other color symbol
, Poland
, Italy
, Colombia

White, black, green, grey

 – two different shades of green

White, black, purple

White, black, purple, grey

White, black, murrey

 (1918-1921)
 (1991–2004)

White, red

, United Arab Emirates
 (1496–1903)
, Japan
, United Arab Emirates
, Japan
, United States
, Belgium
, historical flag of House of Árpád
, Paraguay – with other color symbol
, Colombia

, Italy
, Switzerland
, France
 (1918, 1991–1995)
, Poland (with multicolored coat of arms)
, United States
, Germany
, used during the American Revolution
, Germany
, Czech Republic
, Canada
, United States (with multicolored emblem and text)

, Spain (with multicolored coat of arms)
, Bolivia
, England, United Kingdom
, historical flag of the Duchy of Burgundy and Spain

, United States
, Netherlands
, United Arab Emirates
, Chile
, Netherlands
, Poland
, United Kingdom
, Italy
, United States – with other color symbol
, Germany
 (to 1866) – with multicolored coat of arms
, French overseas territory (with multicolored emblem)
, United Arab Emirates (to 1961)
, Japan (orangish red)
, Italy

, France
 (British overseas territory) – with other color symbol
, Wales, United Kingdom

, Netherlands
 (Danish autonomous country)
, Germany
, Germany
, Germany (to 1945)
 (to 1866)
 (to 1866)
, Japan
 (Chinese special administrative region)
, Netherlands

, historical flag of Ireland

, used by the Japanese military
, Switzerland
, Japan
, Malaysia
, England, United Kingdom
, Netherlands
, Japan
, Poland (with multicolored coat of arms)
, Japan
 (1952–1975)
, Netherlands
, Belgium
, Belgium
, Germany (to 1937)
, Netherlands
, Spain
 – with other color symbol
 (variant)

, Russia (with multicolored coat of arms)
, Victoria, Australia – with other color symbol
, Italy

, Belgium
, Canada
, Japan
, Switzerland
, Netherlands
 (de facto state, limited recognition)
, Switzerland
, Japan
, Japan
, Poland (with multicolored coat of arms)
, Western Australia, Australia (with multicolored emblem)

 (1815–1848)

 (variant) (with other color symbol)
, Bolivia
, Myanmar (with blue emblem)
, UAE
 (1803–1810)
, Netherlands
, Japan
, Austria
 (1416–1792 & 1814–1860)
, Switzerland
, United Arab Emirates

, Belgium
, Poland (with multicolored coat of arms)
, Poland (with multicolored coat of arms)
, Switzerland

, Bolivia
, Germany
, Mexico

, Belgium
 (1947–1954)

, Austria
, United Arab Emirates
, Austria
, Netherlands
, Netherlands
, Switzerland
, France
, Austria
, Austria
, England, United Kingdom
, Poland (with multicoloured coat of arms)
, political party of Brazil
 (1927–1962)

White, red, blue

, Georgia
, Brazil (with multicolored coat of arms)
, Brazil
, (US insular area) (with multicolor emblem)
 (British overseas territory) – with other color symbol
, United States
 (part of the British overseas territory of Saint Helena, Ascension and Tristan da Cunha) – with other color symbol
 – with other color symbol, two shades of blue or red (may or may not always be included)

, Brazil
 (914–1908)
 (with multicolored coat of arms)
 (British overseas territory) – with other color symbol
 (British overseas territory) – with other color symbol
 (British overseas territory) – with other color symbol
, Poland (with multicolored coat of arms)

, Italy
 (British overseas territory) (with multicolored coat of arms)
, Paraguay
, Illinois, United States

 (Taiwan and surrounding islands)
, flag in use 1860–1866

, Ohio, United States
, Ohio, United States – with other color symbol
, unrecognised, 1861–1865, flag in use 1861–1863
 (battle flag, used by the Confederate military), 1861–1865

 (civil flag)
 Ukraine (occupied by Russia)
 – with other color symbol

, Texas, United States – with other color symbol
, United States
 – with other color symbol
, United States
, Argentina
 (British overseas territory) – with other color symbol
 (Danish autonomous country)
 – with other color symbol; two different shades of blue

, Netherlands
, naval ensign
, used during the Occupation Period to identify German ships according to international law.
, United States
, England, United Kingdom
, Japan

, São Paulo, Brazil
, Indiana, United States
, United States (with multicolored emblem)
, Malaysia
, United States
, Myanmar
 (1970–1975)

, Poland (with multicolored coat of arms)

 (civil ensign)
, Belgium
, Colombia
, Canada – with other color symbol
, Russia (2006–2011)
 (1587–1755)
, United States (1894–1996)
, United States (1996–2001)
, United States (2001–2020)
, United States – with other color symbol
, United States – with other color symbol
 (British overseas territory) – with other color symbol
, Russia
 (British colony, 1870–1910) – with other color symbol
 (1839–1843, unrecognized)

, Louisiana, United States – with gold emblems

, (aka New Aquitaine),France
, United States

, Brazil
 – with other color symbol
 (British overseas territory) – with other color symbol
 (US insular area)
, Bosnia and Herzegovina
, British colony, 1953–1963 – with other color symbol

, Malaysia – three different shades of blue
 (part of the British overseas territory of Saint Helena, Ascension and Tristan da Cunha) – with other color symbol

, Germany (to 1946)
, Germany
 – with other color symbol
 (1992–2006)

 (1976–1977)
, Kingdom of the Netherlands – with other color symbol

 – with other color symbol
, Ethiopia (with multicolored emblem)
 (British overseas territory) – with other color symbol
, United States
, Australia
, United States
, United States

, Ontario, Canada
 (British colony, 1903–1910) – with other color symbol
, United States
 (part of the British overseas territory of Saint Helena, Ascension and Tristan da Cunha) – with other color symbol
 (British overseas territory) – with other color symbol

, one of the three official flags of Uruguay
, one of the three official flags of Uruguay (with black text)
 (British overseas territory) – with other color symbol
, French overseas territory, unofficial
 (1961–1962)
, United States
 (1918–1946)
 (1943–1946)
 (1945–1992) – with gold outline

White, red, blue, green

, Italy – with other color symbol
, Ethiopia (with multicolored emblem)
, France

, unofficial flag of Chicano nationalism, with other color symbol
, Myanmar (with multicolored emblem)

 – with other color symbol

, Netherlands
, Costa Rica
, Bosnia and Herzegovina – with other color symbol
, Ecuador

 (1966–1987)
, Venezuelan state
 (1884–1888, unrecognized)
, Ethiopia
, Russia
, Ethiopia
, Ethiopia
 (1852–1877 & 1881–1902)
 (1950–1963)
, French Mandate for Syria and Lebanon (1925–1930)

White, red, green

 (de facto state, limited recognition)

, Paraguay – with other color symbol
, Germany (1863–1945)
, Paraguay – with other color symbol
, Spain

 (with multicolored coat of arms), in use 1996–2007
, Colombia

, São Paulo, Brazil (with multicolored coat of arms)
, Bosnia and Herzegovina
, Panama
 (1797–1802)
 (1796–1797)
, Poland
, Ethiopia (with multicolored emblem)

, Russia

 (1861–1946) – with other color symbol

, Poland (with multicolored coat of arms)

, Ecuador
 – with multicolored emblem
, Switzerland
, United States
, Germany
, England, United Kingdom

, Paraguay – with other color symbol
, Bosnia and Herzegovina
, Japan
, Paraguay
, Brazil
 (1977–1996)
, Soviet Union (1953–1991) (emblem is gold)
, Soviet Union (1991–1992)
, Russia
, Venezuela
, United Kingdom
, Bosnia and Herzegovina

White, red, green, grey

, Panama

White, red, grey

, Panama
, Malaysia
, Belgium

White, blue

, Netherlands
, Russia

 – with other color symbol
, Belgium
, Netherlands
, Israel
, Netherlands
, Italy
, Israel
, Germany
, Germany
, United States (with multicolored emblem)
, unofficial flag of the Confederate States of America
, Italy
, United States (with multicolored emblem)
, nominally independent homeland (Bantustan), 1981–1994 (with black emblem)
, Japan (with gold on symbol)
, Federated States of Micronesia
, Colorado, United States (with multicolored emblem)
 (with multicolored coat of arms)
, Argentina (with black text and multicolored coat of arms)
, Poland (with multicolored coat of arms)

 (1845–1860)
 – with other color symbol

, United States (with red symbols)
, Japan
, Japan
, Spain – with other color symbol
, Poland (with multicolored coat of arms)
, Russia

, Russia
 (1960–1975), Brazil (with multicolored coat of arms)
 (with multicolored emblem)
, Ecuador
, Israel
, Netherlands

, Texas, United States (with multicolored seal)
, Japan

, Japan
, Japan

, Japan
, Poland (with multicolored coat of arms)
, used when South Korean and North Korean athletes compete on a shared team
, Federated States of Micronesia
, Poland
, Poland
, Argentina (with multicolored coat of arms)
, Poland
 (1806–1813)
, United States – with other color symbol
, Switzerland
, Luxembourg – with other color symbol
, United States (with multicolored emblem)
, French overseas department, unofficial

, Minnesota, United States
, historical flag used during the American Revolution
, Japan
 (with multicolored emblem)
, Canada (with multicolored coat of arms)
, Japan
 (1826–1842)
, Poland
, Germany (1882–1935)
, Canada
, Brazil (with multicolored coat of arms)
, Poland (with multicolored coat of arms)
, Utah, United States
, Colombia
 – with other color symbol
, Cantabria, Spain – with other color symbol
, Germany (to 1920)
, Germany (to 1920)
, United Kingdom
, Scotland, United Kingdom
, Japan
, Croatia

, Poland
, United States
, used after the 1930s
, Venezuela (with multicolored emblem)
, New York, United States (with multicolored seal)
, Spain
 (1235–1338, 1488–1556)
 (1338–1488)
, Poland (with multicolored coat of arms)
, Japan
 (1965–1986)

, Panama
, United States – with other color symbol
, Japan

 (1807–1813)
, used by Russian anti-war protestors
, Japan
, Federated States of Micronesia
, Switzerland
, Switzerland
, Netherlands

White, blue, green

 (1860-1862)
, Venezuela (with multicolored emblem)
, Poland
 – two shades of green
, Colombia
, England, United Kingdom
, Ecuador
 – three different shades of blue and green
, England, United Kingdom (a cream white)
, Colombia (with multicolored coat of arms)
 (with black seal)
, Russia
, Myanmar
, Poland
, Russia
, Russia
, Poland (with multicolored coat of arms)
, Canada (unofficial)
, province of Costa Rica
, Chile
 (1917–1922)
 (1989–2000)

, Canada
, Brazil
, Paraguay – with other color symbol'

, Ontario, Canada (1954–1997)
, Canada (with multicolored coat of arms)

White, blue, green, tan

 (1987–2006)
, Federated States of Micronesia

White, blue, grey

 (US insular area) – with other color symbol
 (US insular area), 1976-1981
, Colombia

White, blue, pink

, Brazil

White, green

, Spain – with other color symbol
 (to 1863)
 (to 1863)
 (to 1853)
, Colombia
, Japan
, Thailand
, Paraguay
, Colombia
, Germany (1918–1920)
 (1978–1992)
 (1992–1996)
 (1996–2001)
 (1948–1950)
 (1922–1958)
, Ecuador

, Japan
, Netherlands
, Belgium
, Poland
, Estonia
, Japan
, Scotland, United Kingdom
, Colombia
, Italy
, Ecuador
 (1948–1950)
, Colombia
, Japan
, Japan

 (Australian external territory)

, Bolivia
 (1948–1950)
, historical flag used during the American Revolution
 (1968–1979) – with other color symbol
, Netherlands
, Colombia
, Netherlands
, Switzerland
, Bolivia

, Germany (1826–1920)
, Germany (1826–1911)
, Germany (1911–1918)
, Germany (1918–1920)
 (to 1826)
, Germany (to 1920)
, Germany
, Russia
 (1883–1885, de facto state, limited recognition)
, Austria
, Colombia (with multicolored coat of arms)
, Japan
 (1958–1960)
, Japan (Symbol flag)
, Japan
, Colombia – two different shades of green
, Netherlands
, Belgium

White, green, purple

, Puerto Rico

 (United Kingdom)

White, green, pink

White, green, tan

, Paraguay
, nominally independent homeland (Bantustan), 1976–1994

White, purple

, Thailand (with multicolored seal)
, Japan
, Japan

White, purple, grey

White, murrey

 (1806–1808)

, Russia – with other color symbol
, Paraguay – with other color symbol

White, tan

, Japan

White, pink

, Kyrgyzstan

Black

, flag of Jihad (with white text)
 (with multicolored emblem)
, Jihadist organisation in Russia (with white text)
 (with white text and seal)
, flag used in late 2004 (with yellow and white text)
, is the traditional English name for the flags flown to identify a pirate ship preceding or during an attack, during the early 18th century.

Black, red

, Italy

 (1964–1986) – with multicolored coat of arms
, Belgium
, Netherlands
, Germany (to 1945)
, West Germany (1945–1952)

Black, red, blue

, self-proclaimed state in Ukraine
, Poland

Black, red, green

 (2013–2021)

 (French overseas department)

Black, blue, green

 (January-April 1964)

Black, green

Black, purple

Black, grey

Red

, United States (with white text and multicolored emblem)
, Poland (with multicolored coat of arms)
, Venezuela (with multicolored coat of arms)
, Malaysia (with multicolored coat of arms)
 (to 1970)
, Bolivia
, Poland (with multicolored coat of arms)
, Poland (with multicolored coat of arms)

Red, blue

, Ecuador (with multicolored coat of arms)
, Poland
, Ecuador
, Soviet Union (1951–1990)
, Poland (with multicolored coat of arms)
 (US insular area) (with multicolored coat of emblem)
 (with multicolored coat of arms)
 (with gold and black emblem)
, Spain (with multicolored coat of arms)
, Germany (to 1946)
, France (with multicolored coat of arms)
, Poland (with multicolored coat of arms)
, Poland (with multicolored coat of arms)
, Switzerland
, Limburg, the Netherlands (with multicolored coat of arms)
, Poland (with multicolored coat of arms)
, Poland

Red, blue, green

, Venezuela (with multicolored emblem)
, Russia
, Russia
, Myanmar (with multicolored emblem)

Red, green

, Colombia

, Ecuador
, Poland (with multicolored coat of arms)
, Bolivia

, Poland
 (with multicolored coat of arms)
 (civil flag) (de facto state, limited recognition)
, Ecuador
 (Occupied Ukrainian territory controlled by Russia)

Red, tan

, Poland

Blue

, Canada (with multicolored shield of arms)
, Massachusetts, United States (with multicolored emblem)
, Bolivia
 (with multicolored image)
, United States (with multicolored seal)
, United States (with multicolored coat of arms)
, United States (with multicolored coat of arms)
, Wisconsin, United States (with multicolored emblems)
, United States (with multicolored seal)
, United States (with multicolored emblem)
 (1901–2020)

Blue, green

, United States (with multicolored emblem)
, Poland (with multicolored coat of arms)
, Ecuador – two different shades of blue (with multicolored coat of arms)

Blue, purple, pink

Blue, grey

, Nevada, United States (with multicolored emblem)

Green

, Bolivia
, Palestinian entity (with white text)

 (1977–2011)
 (with multicolored coat of arms)
, Poland (with multicolored coat of arms)
 (state), United States – with other color symbol

Grey

 , Chile (with multicolored seal)

Pink

, Thailand (with multicolored seal)

See also
List of flags
List of flags by color
List of flags by number of colors

External links
Extensive list of similar flags from around the world
Interactively explore flags to see similarities in colors, symbols and patterns.

Flags by colour
Flags
 Color
Color schemes